The Museum of the Prehistory of Tuscia and of the Rocca Farnese is a museum  in Valentano, northern Lazio, Italy. It was opened in June 1996, the museum is located in the highest part of  the village, within the Rocca Farnese itself.

It is divided into different areas located on two floors.

First floor: Prehistoric, Etruscan and Roman Sections

The Prehistoric section has artifacts from Tuscia: Chopper (cutting tools used by early hominids), bifaces, scrapers, retouched tips, brooches,  and engraved funeral stones, complemented by an educational department that analyses  topics arising from prehistorically finds in central Italy starting from the Lower Paleolithic through to the Neolithic Age and from the copper age to the Bronze Age, ending with a small section on the Iron Age.

Within  the  Etruscan collection, donated by  Monsignor  Giovanni D'Ascenzi, there are ceramics from Villanovan, Etruscan, Attic and  Corinthian cultures in addition to Phoenician glass paste, and other objects from this period including bronze figures and bone.

The first floor ends with the Roman section, where there are various  finds  from Valentano e.g., 
coins, millstones and architectural elements.

Second floor:  Mediaeval, Renaissance and Modern Sections

This part of the museum revolves around the history of Rocca Farnese and the development of Valentano from the mediaeval times until the contemporary era, with particular attention to the Farnese family who ruled over the Duchy of Castro.

The first showcase is dedicated to Lombard domination with findings such as a sax (sword) in iron plus famous ceramics found in small pits surrounding  the fort. These areas were used  during  epidemics  when a pit was dug to dispose of the belongings of the deceased. 
The other exhibits, dedicated to the Farnese family, include a wedding plate bearing the coat of arms of  the  Farnese/Orsini families on the marriage between  Pier Luigi Farnese and Girolama Orsini.

The tour finishes inside the castle with a visit to the top of the octagonal tower, which dominates the town.

Museums in Lazio
Museums established in 1996
History museums in Italy
Archaeological museums in Italy